Červená hora (Czech for "Red Mountain") may refer to:

 Červená Hora, a village and municipality in the Hradec Králové Region
 Červená hora (Nízký Jeseník), a mountain in Moravia